Heterosternuta is a genus of beetles in the family Dytiscidae, containing the following species:

 Heterosternuta allegheniana (Matta & Wolfe, 1979)
 Heterosternuta cocheconis (Fall, 1917)
 Heterosternuta diversicornis (Sharp, 1882)
 Heterosternuta folkertsi (Wolfe & Matta, 1979)
 Heterosternuta jeanneae (Wolfe & Matta, 1979)
 Heterosternuta jenniferae (Wolfe & Matta, 1979)
 Heterosternuta laeta (Leech, 1948)
 Heterosternuta ohionis (Fall, 1917)
 Heterosternuta oppositus (Say, 1823)
 Heterosternuta ouachita (Matta & Wolfe, 1979)
 Heterosternuta phoebeae Wolfe & Harp, 2003
 Heterosternuta pulchra (LeConte, 1855)
 Heterosternuta sulphuria (Matta & Wolfe, 1979)
 Heterosternuta wickhami (Zaitzev, 1908)

References

Dytiscidae